Raymond Dumais (June 4, 1950 – October 19, 2012) was the Roman Catholic bishop of the Roman Catholic Diocese of Gaspé, Quebec, Canada.

Ordained to the priesthood in 1976, Dumais was named bishop in 1991 and resigned in 2001. He was subsequently married to a woman in a civil ceremony.

References

1950 births
2012 deaths
20th-century Roman Catholic bishops in Canada
Roman Catholic bishops of Gaspé
Université Laval alumni